Nakhlestan Rural District is a rural district (dehestan) in the Central District of Tabas County, South Khorasan Province, Iran. At the 2006 census, its population was 3,122, in 873 families.  The rural district has 3 villages.

References 

Rural Districts of South Khorasan Province
Tabas County